Mostowski (feminine: Mostowska, plural: Mostowscy) is a surname. It may refer to:

 Mostowski Palace, an 18th-century palace in Warsaw
 Andrzej Mostowski (1913 - 1975), a Polish mathematician
 Mostowski collapse lemma, in mathematical logic
 Ehrenfeucht–Mostowski theorem, in model theory
 Mostowski model in set theory

See also 
 Mostovsky

Polish-language surnames